San Diego State University College of Engineering provides San Diego State University students with undergraduate and graduate engineering education. The College of Engineering offers eight degree programs. The Aerospace Engineering, Civil Engineering, Computer Engineering, Electrical Engineering, Environmental Engineering, Mechanical Engineering, and Construction Engineering programs are accredited by the Engineering Accreditation Commission of ABET.

Academics

Degrees
The degrees available through the College of Engineering are Bachelor of Sciences (BS), MA, Master of Engineering, MS, Ed.D, Ph.D.

Special Degrees
 The Master of Engineering degree is an interdisciplinary program with the College of Engineering and the College of Business Administration.
 A joint doctoral program in Engineering Science/Applied Mechanics is available in conjunction with University of California, San Diego (UCSD).
 As of 2005, several new degree programs have been established in bioengineering and in construction engineering.

Departments
The College of Engineering includes eight academic departments: Aerospace Engineering, Bioengineering, Civil Engineering, Construction Engineering, Computer Engineering, Electrical Engineering, Environmental Engineering, and Mechanical Engineering. The aerospace engineering program was ranked #37 among graduate aerospace programs in the United States by the U.S. News & World Report in 2017.

Institutes/Research Centers
 Communication Systems and Signal Processing Institute
 Concrete Materials Research Institute
 Energy Engineering Institute
 Center for Industrial Training and Engineering Research CITER

Facilities

 Advanced Materials Processing Laboratory (AMPL)
Combustion and Solar Energy Research Laboratory (CSEL)
 Energy Analysis Diagnostic Center
 Environmental Engineering Research Laboratories
 Experimental Mechanics Laboratory
 Facility for Applied Manufacturing Enterprise (FAME)
 Geo-Innovations Research Laboratory
 High Speed and Low Speed Wind Tunnels
 Powder Technology Laboratory
 Real-Time DSP and FPGA Development Laboratory

See also
 List of engineering programs in the California State University

References

External links
San Diego State University - College of Engineering
 Carnegie Foundation profile for SDSU
SDSU's Institute of Electrical and Electronics Engineers (IEEE) Chapter
SDSU Racing (Society of Automotive Engineers)

E
Engineering universities and colleges in California